Alakol may refer to the following places in:

Azerbaijan
Alakol, Azerbaijan, a village

Kazakhstan
Alakol or Ala-Kol (Алаколь) is the name of:
Alakol, Almaty Province
Alakol, Amangeldi District, Kostanay Region 
Alakol, Denisov District, Kostanay Region 
Alakol, Pavlodar Region 
Alakol, West Kazakhstan Region 
Alakol, Akmola Region 
Lake Alakol
Alakol Biosphere Reserve
Another name for lake Itishpes
Alakol District in Almaty Region
Alakol Zapovednik

Kyrgyzstan
Ala-Köl, a lake

See also
Alakul culture